William Harris Wharton (April 27, 1802 – March 14, 1839) was an American colonist, diplomat, senator and statesman in early Texas.

Early life and family
Wharton was born in Virginia and was raised by an uncle following the deaths of his parents. He graduated from the University of Nashville and was admitted to the Tennessee bar in 1826. Afterward, Wharton moved to Mexican Texas, and on December 5, 1827, married Sarah Ann Groce, the daughter of a wealthy landowner. Their only child was a son, John A. Wharton (1828–1865), who served in the American Civil War as a Confederate major general. The Wharton family established a farm known as Eagle Island Plantation.

Texas Revolution

Wharton served as a delegate to the Convention of 1832 from the District of Victoria. The convention unanimously elected him to deliver the resolutions to the legislature of Coahuila y Tejas (then a part of Mexico) in Saltillo and to the Mexican Congress in Mexico City. 

Following that convention's unsuccessful attempts to form a new state separate from Coahuila y Tejas, Wharton served as president of the follow-up Convention of 1833 and openly advocated complete independence from Mexico, in contrast to the moderate view held by native Texans and others like Stephen F. Austin. Wharton later served as a delegate from the Columbia district to the Texas Consultation of 1835.

Wharton entered military service during the Texas Revolution, serving as a colonel and judge advocate general. He participated in the siege of San Antonio de Béxar in the fall of 1835. Shortly thereafter, he was appointed as one of three commissioners to the United States to secure aid for the Texians.

Senator
After the revolution resulted in the formation of the Republic of Texas in 1836, Wharton supported Austin's unsuccessful candidacy for president, which was instead won by Sam Houston. Wharton served as a member of the new republic's senate from the District of Brazoria in 1836.

In November, President Houston appointed Wharton as minister to the United States, hoping to secure political recognition and possible annexation. Returning to Texas in 1837 by sea, Wharton was captured by a Mexican ship and carried to Matamoros, where he was imprisoned. He escaped (allegedly by wearing a nun's habit) and returned to Texas to be re-elected to the Texas Senate in 1838.

Wharton introduced the "Lone Star" flag to Congress on December 28, and may have designed it.

Death

Wharton accidentally shot and killed himself while dismounting from his horse near Hempstead in Waller County, Texas, on March 14, 1839. He was buried at Rest wood Memorial Park in Clute, Texas.

Legacy
Both Wharton County, Texas, and its county seat, Wharton, were named for him and his brother John Austin Wharton (1806–1838), who was likewise a statesman of the Republic of Texas.

See also
List of Convention of 1832 delegates
Republic of Texas–United States relations

References

External links

Texas state historical marker for Wharton

1802 births
1839 deaths

People from Virginia
People from Tennessee
People of Mexican Texas
People of the Texas Revolution
Convention of 1832 delegates
Texas Consultation delegates
Republic of Texas Senators
Deaths by firearm in Texas
Firearm accident victims in the United States
Accidental deaths in Texas
Wharton County, Texas